Weird or What? is a series on the Discovery Channel and History (Canada) hosted by William Shatner (except for the U.S. version of Season 1, where his segments were replaced by a fourth story). Each episode contains three separate stories of the bizarre and unexplained. As the show unfolds, it weighs various supernatural and scientific theories that attempt to explain the story, and sometimes features tests conducted as proof of a theory's plausibility. The show features phenomena such as ghosts, aliens, monsters, medical oddities and natural disasters.

Episodes 

The U.S. version of season 1 of the show features four stories per episode. This version is also shown in New Zealand. The version generally shown outside of the U.S. features three stories per episode, in a different order and is hosted by William Shatner.

Season 1 (U.S. version) 

Note: Online streaming of U.S. episodes are not available

Season 1 (International version)

Season 2

Season 3

DVD Releases

See also
 Dark Matters: Twisted But True
 Mystery Hunters

References

External links
 
 

2010 Canadian television series debuts
2010s Canadian documentary television series
Television series by Cineflix
Discovery Channel (Canada) original programming
Paranormal television
Syfy original programming
Television series by Corus Entertainment
Television series about urban legends
2012 Canadian television series endings